Magadanskaya Pravda is a Russian regional socio-political twice-weekly newspaper, published in Magadan on Tuesday and Friday with a circulation of 10,000-20,000; it was established in 1932.

References

Literature
 Essays, articles and documents from the history of the regional newspaper "Magadanskaya Pravda" = Газетной строкой...: Очерки, статьи, документы из истории областной газеты "Магаданская правда" / П. Ф. Бурмистров и др., сост. Т. П. Смолина. — Магадан: Магаданское книжное изд-во, 1986. — 224 p.
 The chronicle of journalism of the Magadan region = Свидетельствуем историю: летопись журналистики Магаданской области / сост. В. Кадцин. - Магадан: Кацубина Т. В., 2013. - 356 p. - .
 Nataly Marchenko, Russian Arctic Seas: Navigational conditions and accidents. - Springer, 2012. - 274 p. - .
 Robert Valliant, Moscow and the Russian Far East. The political dimension // Politics and Economics in the Russian Far East: Changing Ties with Asia-Pacific / ed. Tsuneo Akaha. - Routledge, 2002. - 256 p. - .
 John Round, Rescaling Russia's Geography: The Challenges of Depopulating the Northern Periphery // Europe-Asia Studies, Vol. 57, No. 5 (Jul., 2005), pp. 705–727.

External links
 Magadan Oblast // Great Russian Encyclopedia

Magadan
1932 establishments in the Soviet Union
Publications established in 1932
Mass media in Russia
Russian-language newspapers published in Russia